Chione californiensis, common name the California venus, is a species of medium-sized edible saltwater clam, a marine bivalve mollusc in the family Veneridae, the venus clams.

The species was eaten by the indigenous peoples of California.

References

Fauna of California
Seafood in Native American cuisine
Veneridae
Bivalves described in 1835